The fortification of Burggraf, also called the Burggrafenstein  or Furchste, is a levelled prehistorical or early medieval sector fortification on a hill spur between Untertrubach and Dörnhof near Gräfenberg in the county of Forchheim in the south German state of Bavaria.

The fortification was recorded in 1417 as a burgstall. It consisted of ramparts and an entrance passage at the southwest corner and probably a second on the southeast side. Only the remains of two sector ramparts have survived.

Literature 
 Walter Heinz: Ehemalige Adelssitze im Trubachtal. Verlag Palm und Enke, Erlangen und Jena, 1996,

External links 

 

Castles in Bavaria
Gräfenberg, Bavaria